is an active stratovolcano located 10 km east of Tazawa Lake, near the border between Akita and Iwate prefectures on Honshu Island. The volcano last erupted from 18 September 1970 to 25 January 1971. It is the highest mountain in Akita Prefecture  and the second highest in Towada-Hachimantai National Park.

References

External links 
 
 Akita-Komagatake - Japan Meteorological Agency 
  - Japan Meteorological Agency
 Akita Komagatake - Geological Survey of Japan
 Akita-Komagatake: Global Volcanism Program - Smithsonian Institution

Volcanoes of Honshū
Active volcanoes
Mountains of Akita Prefecture
Volcanoes of Akita Prefecture
Stratovolcanoes of Japan
Tourist attractions in Akita Prefecture
Pleistocene stratovolcanoes
Holocene stratovolcanoes